Noadiah Johnson (1795 Connecticut – April 4, 1839 Albany, New York) was an American lawyer, newspaperman, and politician who served one term as a U.S. Representative from New York from 1833 to 1835.

Life
He removed to Delaware County, New York, in 1817.
He studied law, was admitted to the bar, and commenced practice in Delhi, New York. He was District Attorney of Delaware County from 1825 to 1833. He was one of the publishers of the Delaware Gazette.

Political career 
Johnson was elected as a Jacksonian to the 23rd United States Congress, holding office from March 4, 1833, to March 3, 1835. He was a member of the New York Senate (3rd D.) from 1837 until his death, sitting in the 60th, 61st and 62nd New York State Legislatures.

Death and burial 
He died on April 4, 1839, and was buried at the Old Delhi Cemetery, Delhi, New York.

Family 
State Senator Stephen C. Johnson was his brother.

Sources

The American Biographical Sketch Book by William Hunt (1849; pg. 219)

1795 births
1839 deaths
Democratic Party New York (state) state senators
People from Delhi, New York
Jacksonian members of the United States House of Representatives from New York (state)
19th-century American politicians
19th-century American lawyers
County district attorneys in New York (state)
Democratic Party members of the United States House of Representatives from New York (state)